René Highway (November 6, 1954 – October 19, 1990) was an Indigenous Canadian dancer and actor of Cree descent from Brochet, Manitoba.  He was the brother of playwright Tomson Highway, with whom he frequently collaborated during their time at Native Earth Performing Arts in Toronto, and the partner of actor and singer Micah Barnes.

Highway helped to create the role of Nanabush in his brother's play The Rez Sisters (1986), and was the choreographer for Dry Lips Oughta Move to Kapuskasing (1989).

He died of AIDS-related causes in Toronto in 1990. His partner was singer Micah Barnes.

Native Earth Performing Arts started the René Highway Foundation in his memory.

Further reading
 Scudeler, J. ' Fed by Spirits: Mamâhtâwisiwin in René Highway's New Song… New Dance' in Native American and Indigenous Studies, Vol. 3, No. 1 (2016), pp. 1–23, available at: https://www.academia.edu/32593127/Fed_by_Spirits_Mama_hta_wisiwin_in_Rene_Highways_New_Song_New_Dance.

References

External links

1954 births
1990 deaths
First Nations male actors
Canadian male stage actors
First Nations dancers
Canadian gay actors
AIDS-related deaths in Canada
People from Northern Region, Manitoba
Cree people
Male actors from Saskatchewan
LGBT dancers
LGBT First Nations people
20th-century Canadian male actors
Male actors from Manitoba
20th-century Canadian dancers
20th-century Canadian LGBT people